OSS 117 Is Unleashed aka  OSS 117 se déchaîne is a 1963 French spy film starring Kerwin Mathews. It is part of the OSS 117 series.

Cast
Kerwin Mathews as Hubert Bonisseur de La Bath, alias OSS 117
Nadia Sanders as Brigitta
Irina Demick as Lucia 
Henri-Jacques Huet as Renotte
Jacques Harden as Roos
Roger Dutoit as Mayan
Albert Dagnant as Forestier

Reception
It was the 14th most popular film of the year in France with admissions of 2,329,798. Mathews reprised the role one more time in Shadow of Evil.

References

External links
OSS 117 se déchaîne at IMDb
film page at Uni France
Film review at Lucid Nightmare

1963 films
1960s French-language films
French spy thriller films
1960s spy thriller films
French black-and-white films
French sequel films
Films directed by André Hunebelle
1960s French films